DCR Workforce (“DCR”) is a cloud-based software vendor for service procurement. DCR offers advanced workforce intelligence consulting and predictive/prescriptive analytics in the non-employee workforce space. Additionally, their on line publication DCR TrendLine and blog both provide topics covering global market intelligence, analytics and industry news or trends to the marketplace. They’re headquartered in Boca Raton, Florida.

Company overview
DCR Workforce is a privately held company led by Ammu Warrier. As a minority entrepreneur, Ammu is committed to supporting diversity and promoting women in the traditionally male-dominated careers of Science, Technology, Engineering and Math (STEM).

DCR Workforce practices strict compliance regarding data management and storage rules as well as full observance of all data privacy regulations in the U.S. and globally. Smart Track, its Vendor Management System (VMS), has a global infrastructure with data storage rules based on origination and ownership. They were acquired by Coupa in Sep, 2018.

See also 
 Workforce management
 Contingent labor
 Contingent workforce
 Independent contractor
 Software as a service
 Vendor management system

References 

Consulting firms established in 1995
Human resource management consulting firms